League tables for teams participating in Nelonen, the fifth tier in the Finnish Soccer League system, in 2010.

2010 League tables

Helsinki

Section 1

Section 2

Play-offs
 FC Degis (Lohko 1/I) FC Puotila (Lohko 2/I)       4-3 (0-2)
 Vesa (Lohko 1/II)    Gnistan/Ogeli (Lohko 2/II)   1-3 (0-2)

Uusimaa

Section 1

Section 2

South-East Finland (Kaakkois-Suomi)

Eastern Finland (Itä-Suomi)

Section A

Note: SC Riverball/2 withdrew

Section B

Note: Warkaus JK/2 Withdrew

Section Winners play-offs

Central Finland (Keski-Suomi)

Northern Finland (Pohjois-Suomi)

Oulu

Lapland (Lappi)

Central Ostrobothnia (Keski-Pohjanmaa)

Vaasa

Satakunta

Note: ReKu Withdrew

Tampere

Turku and Åland (Turku and Ahvenanmaa)

Footnotes

References and sources
Finnish FA
ResultCode

Nelonen (football) seasons
5
Finland
Finland